The Parc des Eaux Vives has a surface of  and is situated at the Quai Gustave-Ador in Geneva, right next at the Parc La Grange. It is a sloping hillside park topped by a historic mansion dating back to the 18th century, that now serves as a hotel and restaurant.  The headquarters of the Geneva Sports Association is as well located in this park.

Tourist attractions in Geneva
Parks in Switzerland
Geography of Geneva